The Silicone Veil is the third studio album by Norwegian singer-songwriter Susanne Sundfør, released on 23 March 2012 in Norway and on 15 October in the United Kingdom. It is her first album to be released in the UK. The album was recorded at Pooka Studio and Kikitépe Tearoom Studio. Three singles were released from the album, "White Foxes", "The Silicone Veil" and "Among Us". The video for "Among Us" was directed by Evan McNary and was premiered on Vices Noisey. Sundfør chose the video as part of a competition by Genero.tv for fans to make a video for the single.

Composition
Characterized primarily as electro-folk, The Silicone Veil has also been classified as a mixture of baroque pop, electronic, and art pop. The Daily Telegraph said the album is "a flawless distillation of dreamy synth-pop, imposing Scandinavian electronica and showy baroque classicism." The Ontarion wrote, "Sundfør displays an extensive vocal range – from high warbling pitches to quietly provocative tones – but it is the presence of a deeply entrancing and eclectic array of unique electronic and orchestra generated sounds which makes this sensory experience truly worthwhile."

Sundfør described the songs on The Silicone Veil as being a reflection of "apocalypse, death, love and snow."

Critical reception

The album received critical acclaim from music critics. In his rave review of the album, Daniel Paton of MusicOMH praised Sundfør for not being afraid to explore "both her lyrical and musical preoccupations to challenging and sometimes uncomfortable depths," stating that "The Silicone Veil is every bit as magisterial and conceptually loaded as her previous album of songs. [...] Selecting examples and highlights can hardly begin to offer an impression of the boldness and confidence of this wonderful album. Sundfør's combination of careful, detailed arrangement and unrepentant magic realism is visionary and enriching." Sputnikmusic's Nick Butler said "while her voice feels like the album's main strength on first listen, it doesn't take long to appreciate how good the music is here. The mood is consistent, wistful and pretty, but the sound touches on all sorts of bases," while later hailing the album for being "carefully orchestrated, beautiful sung, and imaginatively written." The Line of Best Fit critic Michael James Hall wrote, "this is an album of spectral, elemental romance and intrigue, playfully but precisely woven into a tremulous tapestry of seemingly ever-oscillating sound."

In 2015, The Ontarion awarded the album their "Album of the Week" accolade, stating: "While the 29-year-old Norwegian artist released her fifth studio album Ten Love Songs earlier this year, The Silicone Veil is one album that definitely calls for (repeated) revisiting." The Daily Telegraph included the album in their  "50 amazing albums you've never heard" list in August 2017, calling it Sundfør's finest work to date.

Track listing

Credits and personnel
Credits adapted from the liner notes of The Silicone Veil.

Locations
 Recorded at Pooka Studio and Kikitépe Tearoom Studio
 Strings recorded at Øra Studio
 Mixed at Duper Studio 
 Mixed at The Best Studio in Oslo 
 Mastered at Cutting Room Studios

Personnel

 Susanne Sundfør – vocals, production, arrangements, piano, synthesizers, Fender Rhodes Electric Suitcase piano, synth bass, vibraphone, autoharp, drum programming, string arrangements, recording
 Lars Horntveth – production, arrangements, bass guitar, synthesizers, lap steel guitar, pedal steel guitar, acoustic guitar, vibraphone, tubular bells, synth bass, church organ, piano, drum programming, string arrangements, recording
 Gard Nilssen – drums, percussion
 Jørgen Træen – additional drum programming and editing, electronics, mixing
 Øystein Moen – synth bass , church organ 
 Erik Johannessen – trombone
 Line Horntveth – tuba
 Sunniva Rødland Wettre – harp
 Rolf Hoff Baltzersen – contrabass
 Stian Westerhus – electronics , mixing 
 Jo Ranheim – strings recordings
 Björn Engelmann – mastering
 MVM – artwork

TrondheimSolistene

 Anders Larsen – violin
 Anna Adolfsson Vestad – violin
 Daniel Turcina – violin
 Erling Skaufel – violin
 Fride Bakken Johansen – violin
 Hilde Gimse – violin
 Ingrid Wisur – violin
 Karl Jonatan Lilja – violin
 Tora Stølan Ness – violin
 Bergmund Waal Skaslien – viola 
 Frøydis Tøsse – viola
 Lars Marius Hølås – viola
 Cecilie Koch – cello
 Marit Aspås – cello
 Tabita Berglund – cello

References

2012 albums
EMI Records albums
Susanne Sundfør albums